The 1948 Temple Owls football team was an American football team that represented Temple University as an independent during the 1948 college football season. In its ninth season under head coach Ray Morrison, the team compiled a 2–6–1 record and was outscored by a total of 182 to 95. The team played its home games at Temple Stadium in Philadelphia.

Schedule

References

Temple
Temple Owls football seasons
Temple Owls football